Shi Xin (born 13 January 1987 in Nanjing) is a retired Chinese competitor in synchronized swimming. Xin is married and has two daughters. She is currently a synchronized swimming coach for the Mad City Aqua Stars in Madison, Wisconsin

She has won a silver medal at the 2009 World Aquatics Championships, 2 silvers at the 2010 FINA Synchronized Swimming World Cup, and a gold medal at the 2010 Asian Games.

References
 花游美女史欣因伤退役 钢板美人鱼无缘伦敦

Living people
Chinese synchronized swimmers
1987 births
World Aquatics Championships medalists in synchronised swimming
Sportspeople from Nanjing
Synchronized swimmers from Jiangsu
Artistic swimmers at the 2010 Asian Games
Asian Games medalists in artistic swimming
Synchronized swimmers at the 2009 World Aquatics Championships
Asian Games gold medalists for China
Medalists at the 2010 Asian Games

Nanjing Sport Institute alumni